And Far Away is an album by American jazz pianist Kenny Drew recorded in 1983 and released on the Soul Note label.

Reception

The Allmusic review states "This Kenny Drew session from 1983 takes the pianist out of familiar hard bop territory".

Track listing
All compositions by Kenny Drew except as indicated
 "And Far Away" - 9:10   
 "Rianne" (Philip Catherine) - 8:10   
 "Serenity" - 4:57   
 "I Love You" (Cole Porter) - 7:15   
 "Twice a Week" (Catherine) - 2:23   
 "Autumn Leaves" (Joseph Kosma, Johnny Mercer, Jacques Prévert) - 7:50   
 "Blues Run" - 3:26

Personnel
Kenny Drew - piano
Philip Catherine - guitar
Niels-Henning Ørsted Pedersen - bass
Barry Altschul - drums

References

Kenny Drew albums
1983 albums
Black Saint/Soul Note albums